Hulypegis is a monotypic moth genus of the family Erebidae described by Nye in 1975. Its only species, Hulypegis procopialis, was first described by Jacob Hübner in 1825. It is found in Suriname.

References

Calpinae
Monotypic moth genera